The Prevention of Cruelty to Animals Act, 1960, is an Act of the Parliament of India enacted in 1960 to prevent the infliction of unnecessary pain or suffering on animals and to amend the laws relating to the prevention of cruelty to animals. The act defines "animal" as 'any living creature other than a human being'.  

Chapter II of the Act details the establishment of a governing body to promote and enforce the Act. As per the provisions of the law, in 1962, the government of India formed the Animal Welfare Board of India and appointed noted humanitarian and acclaimed dancer Rukmani Devi Arundale as steward.

Chapter III of the Act lists multiple different forms of cruelty that are banned by the Act, including those related to work animals, captivity, ownership, abuse, mutilation or killing.   
Chapter IV of the Act deals with experimentation on animals. While it does not make it lawful to perform experiments on animals for the advancement of knowledge, it does allow the Board to advise the Central Government to create a committee for "purpose of controlling and supervising experiments on animals". The formed committee can then be authorized to inspect any institution or place that is suspected of violating the rules set out under chapter 17 of the Act, and subject to penalties detailed in section 20 upwards to the amount of 200 rps (appox $2.46).  

Chapter V outlines the restrictions, procedures for registration, offences to and exemptions for performing animals. It does not expressly prohibit any animal from exhibition or training, but allows the Central Government to deem an animal prohibited through the notification in the Official Gazette. However, in individual cases, a court or magistrate can prohibit a person from these activities, if it has proven that "that the training or exhibition of any performing animal has been accompanied by unnecessary pain or suffering". Penalties for offences of chapter V are a maximum of 500 rps (appox $6.14) fine or up to three months imprisonment. Exemptions are made for the use of trained animals by the military and police and animals kept in zoos or on display for other educational and scientific purposes.

The act however makes a provision under heading [Chapter VI, Heading 28]: "Saving as respects manner of killing prescribed by religion: Nothing contained in this
Act shall render it an offence to kill any animal in a manner required by the religion of any community." Chapter VI also includes regulations on the seizing of animals from owners, treatment and care of those seized animals, the limits of prosecution and the delegation of powers of the Central Government to enforce this Act.

Current Events 
In late 2022, the Ministry of Fisheries, Animal Husbandry and Dairying, submitted a draft Prevention of Cruelty to Animals (Amendment) Bill 2022 for public comment. The draft includes 61 amendments that aim to further clarify the law and make punishments more stringent. 

The amendment includes 'bestiality' as crime, under the new category of 'gruesome cruelty', while increasing the penalties for violation from the current (first time) fines of Rs 10 - 50 (approx $0.12 - $0.61), to Rs 50,000 - 75,000 ($614.00 - $921.50), 'or the cost of the animal, whichever is more or with the imprisonment of one year to 3 years or with both'. The draft Bill also allows for many offences to be made cognizable, which allows for arrests without a search warrant and in cases of killing an animal, a maximum punishment of up to five years in jail.

These updates were created after the Supreme Court of India instructed Parliament to update the law to 'make proper amendment of the PCA Act to provide an effective deterrent to achieve  the object  and  purpose of the  Act', in case Animal Welfare Board of India (AWBI) vs A Nagaraja & Ors (2014).

In the following years, and after numerous high-profile animal cruelty cases in the media, animal welfare organisations and political leaders called for the law to be amended, including Kishanganj MP Mohammed Jawed in 2020, Kendrapara MP Anubhav Mohanty in 2021, and in 2020 'a group of MPs cutting across party lines wrote to then Animal Husbandry Minister Giriraj Singh, urging that the punishment in the 1960 Act be increased'.

Also included is an outline of the five freedoms guaranteed to animals : freedom from thirst, hunger and malnutrition; freedom from discomfort due to environment; freedom from pain, injury and diseases; freedom to express normal behaviour for the species; freedom from fear and distress.

Public comments are collected until December 7, 2022 and once the bill is final, it could be brought to the Parliament in either their Winter Session or Budget Session.

Additional Resources
Naresh Kadyan, Chief National Commissioner along with Mrs. Sukanya Berwal, Commissioner on Education, Scouts & Guides for Animals & Birds, introduced two legal books, related to PCA Act, 1960 in Hindi along with mobile app: Scouts & Guides for Animals & Birds. Abhishek Kadyan, along with Mrs. Suman Kadyan, also contributed from Canada.

Notes

References

Acts of the Parliament of India 1960
Animal welfare and rights in India
Animal welfare and rights legislation
1960 in law
1960 in India